Acronicta intermedia is a moth of the family Noctuidae. It is found in the Korean Peninsula,  from China to Tibet, Japan (Hokkaido, Honshu), the Russian Far East (Primorye, southern Khabarovsk and Sakhalin and the southern Kuriles), Taiwan and Vietnam.

External links
Korean Insects

Acronicta
Moths of Asia
Moths described in 1909